Paul King is an American football official in the National Football League (NFL) since the 2009 NFL season, wearing uniform number 121. He is the umpire on Land Clark's officiating crew for the 2020 NFL season. Outside of his NFL duties, he is a middle school mathematics teacher at Worcester east middle school in Worcester Massachusetts.

References

Year of birth missing (living people)
Living people
National Football League officials
Nichols College alumni
Worcester State University alumni